The Valle d'Aosta Open is a tennis tournament held in Courmayeur, Italy since 2011.

Past finals

Singles

Doubles

See also
 ATP Saint-Vincent

References

External links
 

ATP Challenger Tour
Hard court tennis tournaments
Tennis tournaments in Italy
Sport in Courmayeur